Hamaxia is a genus of flies in the family Tachinidae.

Species
 Hamaxia cumatilis Mesnil, 1978
 Hamaxia incongrua Walker, 1860 
 Hamaxia mutatum Villeneuve, 1936 
 Hamaxia monochaeta Chao & Yang, 1998

References

Tachinidae